The Men's time trial H4 road cycling event at the 2016 Summer Paralympics took place on 14 September at Flamengo Park, Pontal. Twelve riders from nine nations competed.

The H4 category is a handcycle class is for cyclists with lower limb disabilities and  neurological dysfunction.

Results : Men's road time trial H4

References

Men's road time trial H4